Iceberg Lake is a glacial lake located in Whatcom County, Washington near Mount Baker. The lake is a popular area for hiking.

See also
Mazama Lakes

References

External links
Lakes Loop Trail
Chain Lakes Trail #682

Lakes of Washington (state)
Lakes of Whatcom County, Washington